Herman Geiger-Torel,  (July 13, 1907 – October 6, 1976) was a Canadian opera director.

In 1969, he was made an Officer of the Order of Canada.

References

External links

 Herman Geiger-Torel at Encyclopedia of Music in Canada
 Collection of opera scores annotated by Herman Geiger-Torel at University of Toronto Music Library

1907 births
1976 deaths
Canadian classical musicians
German emigrants to Canada
20th-century German Jews
Officers of the Order of Canada
Canadian opera directors
Musicians from Frankfurt
20th-century classical musicians
20th-century Canadian male musicians